Peter Matthew Siddle (born 25 November 1984) is an Australian  cricketer. He is a specialist right-arm fast-medium bowler who currently plays for Tasmania in first-class and List A cricket and for the Adelaide Strikers in the Big Bash League. He has played Test cricket for Australia over an eight-year period from 2008 to 2016, before being recalled for the Test series against Pakistan in 2018. Peter Siddle retired from International cricket in December 2019.

Early in Siddle's career he faced injury problems, but he overcame them in 2009 to be named the ICC Emerging Player of the Year. Though injuries continued to plague him throughout his career, he rose to prominence in the 2010–11 Ashes series when he became the ninth Australian to take a Test hat-trick and the first Australian since Shane Warne in 1994–95 to do so in an Ashes test. He remained a regular fixture in Australia's team until his bowling pace started to drop in 2014, with Australia's selectors beginning to focus on younger, faster bowlers.

Siddle became a vegan in 2012, subsequently receiving criticism that suggested his diet had a negative effect on his performance, which he disputed.

Siddle announced his international retirement, effective immediately on 29 December 2019.

Early life and career
Siddle was born in Traralgon, Victoria and grew up in nearby Morwell in the Gippsland region. Originally a competitive woodchopper, he began playing cricket at the age of 14 for the Latrobe Cricket Club. As a teenager he experienced success, taking 11/47 in a state match at under-17 level. It was in this match that Siddle broke the Victorian state record set by John Scholes.

In 2003, Siddle attended the Australian Cricket Academy and made his first-class debut playing for Victoria against a touring West Indian side at the Melbourne Cricket Ground in November 2005. In 2006, he attended the academy again and was offered a full contract with the Victorian Bushrangers for the 2006–07 season. Shoulder injuries began to hamper Siddle, with a shoulder reconstruction sidelining him for most of the 2006–07 season and further problems interrupting the 2007–08 season. Despite his injury problems he made himself an important part of Victoria's bowling attack, returning figures of 6/57 in an innings against South Australia and taking nine wickets in Victoria's Pura Cup final loss to New South Wales. Siddle required a second shoulder reconstruction at the end of the season and, despite missing more than half of the season due to shoulder injuries, took 33 wickets at an average of 15.75 to attract attention from national selectors.

Test career (2008–2019)

Emerging Player of the Year (2008–2009)
After touring India with Australia A, Siddle was named in the national 15-man squad for the four-Test tour of India on 12 September 2008, as back up to established bowlers Brett Lee, Stuart Clark and Mitchell Johnson. When Clark injured his elbow prior to the second Test, Siddle was selected in the match squad. He made his Test debut at the Punjab Cricket Association Stadium in Mohali on 16 October 2008. His first ball was a bouncer which hit Indian batsman Gautam Gambhir in the head and his maiden Test wicket was that of Sachin Tendulkar. He picked up figures of 3/114 in the first innings and finished the match with figures of 4/176.

Siddle lost his position when Clark recovered, but he got back into the side for the first Test against South Africa at the WACA due to Clark's elbow injury recurring, and during Australia's back-to-back series against South Africa he solidified his place in the team. He broke through with three wickets in front of his home crowd at the Melbourne Cricket Ground during the Boxing Day Test Match against the Proteas on his way to figures of four for 81 in the first innings. Siddle backed this performance up in the next Test at the Sydney Cricket Ground, taking five for 59 in South Africa's first innings. His efforts were not enough, however, to prevent Australia from succumbing to a historic home series defeat.

Siddle also gave a fine account of himself on the South African leg of the rubber, in which the Australians triumphed 2–1. Going into the 2009 Ashes series, he had notched up 29 Test wickets at an average of 27.65. The fact that it had come in six Tests against the South Africans and one in India, with an economy rate of only 2.57 an over, helped make his record look even more impressive.

In the first Test of the 2009 Ashes series against England, Siddle took 2/97 on the first day's play. Siddle then took 5/21 on the first day of the fourth Test of the 2009 Ashes series which, to that point, were his career best bowling figures in an innings in Test cricket. After the Ashes, Siddle was named the ICC Emerging Player of the Year for 2009.

Hat-trick and injury issues (2009–2013)
Siddle had a relatively quiet 2009–10 season before a back stress fracture ruled him out of cricket in January 2010. He recovered from the injury in time for the 2010–11 Ashes series in Australia the next Summer.

In his first Test match back, on 25 November 2010, Siddle's 26th birthday, he became the ninth Australian to take a Test hat-trick. Siddle had been controversially brought into the Australian side ahead of Doug Bollinger despite not having played since January, but he proved doubters wrong early in the match by taking the key wickets of Kevin Pietersen and Paul Collingwood early in England's first innings. When England had reached 4/197, Siddle was brought back into the attack and took the wickets of Alastair Cook and Matt Prior in consecutive balls to be on a hat-trick. Stuart Broad came to the crease for the hat-trick ball, on which Siddle bowled a yorker. Broad missed the ball with his bat, so it hit his foot and he was given out leg before wicket. Broad referred the decision to the third umpire, but the wicket was not overturned. Siddle went on to dismiss Graeme Swann for his sixth wicket of the innings and almost took a seventh when wicket-keeper Brad Haddin dropped James Anderson off his bowling. He finished with figures of six wickets for just 54 runs, his best ever in Test match cricket, having bowled 16 overs in total.

Despite a heavy series loss to England, Siddle had another successful match in the Boxing Day Test Match at the Melbourne Cricket Ground, taking 6/75 in an innings loss. Siddle started to enjoy more consistent success, starring against India the next summer with 23 wickets at an average of 18.65. During the series, he took his 100th Test wicket at the SCG on 3 January 2012 and rose to a career-high seventh in the ICC's Test bowler rankings. In the final match of the series he took impressive innings bowling figures of 5/49 on a batting wicket at the Adelaide Oval, even being on a hat-trick at one stage in the match. For this performance he was named the man of the match.

During Australia's tour of the West Indies in early 2012, Siddle suffered another back injury and had to fly home early. Siddle had signed for English county Essex for the 2012 Friends Life t20, England's premier Twenty20 competition, but due to his injury he was unable to fulfill his contract with the club. Siddle returned to the Australian Test team for their series against South Africa at the end of 2012. Whilst out injured, he decided to become a vegetarian. The series was very difficult for Siddle because of the very heavy workload he faced. In the first Test of the series at the Gabba, he was forced to bowl 53 overs in a draw and in the second Test at the Adelaide Oval he bowled 63.5 overs — the most by any Australian fast bowler in a single Test match in the 21st century, as his workload had been compounded by an injury to teammate James Pattinson mid-match. Australia needed to bowl South Africa out in the final two days of the Test match to avoid a second consecutive draw and Siddle was the most successful Australian bowler with four wickets. Whilst showing clear signs of exhaustion throughout the final day, Siddle pushed through and took wickets late in the match but was unable to get Australia the win.

Following his heavy workload in the first two Tests of the series, Siddle was rested for the final match. Some of his critics blamed this on his new vegetarian diet, though Siddle himself denied that his diet was responsible for the fatigue. When Siddle returned to the Test team for the series against Sri Lanka, he registered his career-best bowling figures in Test cricket, taking nine wickets across both of Sri Lanka's innings. His spell of 4 for 50 at Hobart was nominated to be one of the best Test bowling performance of the year by ESPNCricinfo. Siddle then struggled to make an impact with his bowling in India, though he did make history by becoming the first number 9 batsman to score a half century in both innings of a Test match.

Back-to-back Ashes series (2013–2014)
Despite nearly constant speculation about his place in the Test team, Siddle was the only Australian bowler to play all ten Tests across the 2013 and 2013–14 Ashes series against England, bowling reliably throughout the two series. At Trent Bridge, in Australia's first bowling innings of either series, Siddle took figures of 5/50 to help bowl England out, proving his value to the team. But his form waned towards the end of the season and he only took one wicket across the last two Tests of the series, which Australia lost 3–0. Again, there were critics who blamed Siddle's poor form on his diet and Siddle continued to deny that his diet had anything to do with his poor form.

Siddle was also an important part of Australia's bowling attack when they won the second series in Australia 5–0. He had particular success through both series against English batsman Kevin Pietersen. He dismissed Pietersen 6 times during the two series, making it 10 times in total that Siddle had dismissed Pietersen in Test cricket. Pietersen said that the reason for this was that he didn't have the patience to work through Siddle's 'robotic' and 'suffocating' tactics and Siddle would bowl with consistently good line and length for long periods of time, resulting in Pietersen scoring much slower against Siddle than against any of the other bowlers in the Australian team. No other bowler dismissed Pietersen on more occasions in Test cricket than Siddle did.

More Test matches (2014–2016)
Siddle became a victim of the Australian selectors' changing policy, focusing more on outright pace than consistent line and length, resulting in him being dropped from the team when he started to lose some of his bowling speed in early 2014. Siddle had lost weight over the last two years, making it difficult for him to bowl as fast as he had previously, so when Australian coach Darren Lehmann emphasized the importance of him bowling at speeds of around 140 kmph, he worked hard to rebuild his frame and improve his pace. There were again critics who blamed his weight loss and slower bowling on his diet, but Siddle blamed it on the fatigue associated with bowling regularly for long periods of time. No longer a regular part of the Test team, Siddle lost his contract with Cricket Australia in early 2015.

Siddle signed to play for Nottinghamshire in 2014, making himself available for all of the LV County Championship and 50-over matches but not the Twenty20s. In July 2014, he played for the Rest of the World side in the Bicentenary Celebration match at Lord's.

Siddle started to make a comeback to Test cricket in 2015, being brought into Australia's team for the 2015 Ashes series. He subsequently became a regular part of the Australian bowling lineup due to the retirement of Mitchell Johnson and an injury to Mitchell Starc. He played enough Test cricket to get himself back on a Cricket Australia contract, but in February 2016 he again had stress fractures in his back. As a result, he was sidelined for most of 2016, with a likely implication being that he had played his final Test match.

Despite the stress fractures in his back keeping him out of cricket for most of 2016, Siddle still retained his contract with Cricket Australia for the 2016–17 season. He returned from injury in October to play for Victoria in three one-day games and a Sheffield Shield match and was selected to play another Test match against South Africa at the WACA. He had bowling figures of 1/36 and 2/62 in the two innings, as Australia lost the match by 177 runs. This looked like being his final Test match for Australia, as he was dropped from the side for the second Test with a back injury. During this summer, the Australian selectors worked on reshaping their bowling attack by focusing more on youth and outright pace, which left Siddle off of their radar moving forwards.

Injury and return to Test cricket (2016–2019)
Siddle's injury kept him out of cricket for a year but, when he returned for the 2017–18 season, he was told that he was still in contention to play Test cricket as James Pattinson was injured and the selectors were looking to protect their young pace attack from being overworked in the upcoming 2017–18 Ashes series. He played every game for Victoria in the 2017–18 JLT One-Day Cup, including an impressive 2/20 performance against the Cricket Australia XI at the tiny Hurstville Oval, a difficult ground to bowl at due to its short boundaries. He then played four of Victoria's first five matches in the 2017–18 Sheffield Shield season, but he only took four wickets and was not included in Australia's squad for the Ashes. This was the first Ashes series he had missed since the 2006–07 Ashes series before his Test debut.

In July 2019, he was named in Australia's squad for the 2019 Ashes series in England.
On 29 December he retired effective immediately from international cricket.

Player profile
Siddle is a right-arm fast-medium bowler who also bats right-handed. He has primarily been used as a workhorse, bowling for long periods of time, such as bowling the most overs by an Australian fast bowler in a 21st-century Test match against South Africa in 2012. His charging run-up and powerful delivery is followed by worrying bounce off the pitch.

Siddle is a Test cricket specialist, bowling with great consistency over long periods of time, worrying aggressive batsmen like Kevin Pietersen. Though he did have a brief stint in Australia's limited overs team, issues with his playing style made it difficult for him to make the same mark that he has had in Test cricket. His consistent line and length was easy for batsmen to predict in One Day Internationals and he did not have enough variations in his bowling to succeed in Twenty20s.
He has now toured on 4 Ashes Tours to England.

Veganism
Siddle has been a vegan since 2012 when his partner Anna, an animal rights activist, convinced him to adopt the lifestyle. He is well known for his diet, which involves him eating as many as 20 bananas a day.

After becoming a vegan, Siddle faced criticism that his change of diet led to fatigue and slower bowling speeds.

Siddle himself has always denied that any of his poor form was related to his diet change and when he was rested from the third Test against South Africa, he said that it was because of the heavy workload he had faced in the previous two Tests, which had been one of the heaviest workloads of any Australian fast bowler in the 21st century.

Siddle is also an animals rights activist, doing charity work for Animals Australia's campaign against factory farming, Edgar's Mission (a sanctuary for farm animals) and the Penguin Foundation, which protects penguins living on Phillip Island.

Personal life
Siddle is married to Anna Weatherlake. They became engaged in 2015 after being together for about four years, but split in 2022.

References

External links 

 

1984 births
Living people
Australian cricketers
Australia Test cricketers
Australia One Day International cricketers
Australia Twenty20 International cricketers
Test cricket hat-trick takers
Victoria cricketers
Melbourne Renegades cricketers
Cricketers from Victoria (Australia)
Lancashire cricketers
People from Traralgon
Nottinghamshire cricketers
Essex cricketers
Adelaide Strikers cricketers
Tasmania cricketers
Somerset cricketers